Faith is a two-part British thriller political drama series written by Simon Burke and directed by John Strickland, first broadcast on ITV between 7 and 8 September 1994. The programme stars Michael Gambon as Peter Moreton, Susannah Harker as Holly Moreton and John Hannah as Nick Simon. The programme was broadcast over two nights for Wednesday and Thursday. Faith was released on DVD in United States on 8 November 2005 by  Koch Vision.

This miniseries was produced by Central Independent Television for the ITV network.

Plot
Peter Moreton, a high-ranking government official, scrambles to keep his secret style hidden from the world when his daughter purposely leaks his affair to a reporter she is dating. Nick Simon is the high-level reporter caught between his love for Holly Moreton, the daughter of Peter Moreton and his desperation to keep his job and land the biggest story of his career.

Cast
 Michael Gambon — Peter Moreton
 John Hannah — Nick Simon
 Susannah Harker — Holly Moreton
 Amelia Bullmore — Ros
 Nicholas Gleaves — Andy Morgan
 Keith Allen — Jeff Wagland
 Connie Booth — Pat Harbinson
 Jeremy Bulloch — David Reckitt
 Fraser James — Steve Maher
 Grace Boyle — Faith Simon
 Gemma Jones — Jane Moreton
 Ken Livingstone — Himself
 Struan Rodger — Matthew Sheridan
 Robin Weaver —  Helena Reckitt
 Carole Nimmons — Gillian Reckitt
 Louis Mahoney — Dr. Jacques
 Nicola Walker – Sallie Grace

Episodes

References

External links
 

1994 British television series debuts
1994 British television series endings
1990s British drama television series
ITV television dramas
1994 in British politics
British thriller television series
British political drama television series
Television series by ITV Studios
Television shows produced by Central Independent Television
English-language television shows
1990s British television miniseries
1990s British political television series
Television shows set in London